The 2020 season is Geylang International's 25th consecutive season in the top flight of Singapore football and in the Singapore Premier League. Along with the Singapore Premier League, the club will also compete in the Singapore Cup.

Squad

Sleague

U19

Coaching staff

Transfers

Pre-season transfers

In

Note 1: Gilson Varela left the club before season start due to personal reason.

Out

Extension / Retained

Promoted

Trial (In)

Trial (Out)

Mid-season transfer

In

Out

Friendlies

Pre-season friendlies

Tour of Malaysia

Tour of Indonesia

Team statistics

Appearances and goals

Competitions

Overview

Singapore Premier League

Singapore Cup

See also 
 2012 Geylang International FC season
 2013 Geylang International FC season
 2014 Geylang International FC season
 2015 Geylang International FC season
 2016 Geylang International FC season
 2017 Geylang International FC season
 2018 Geylang International FC season
 2019 Geylang International FC season

Notes

References 

Geylang International FC
Geylang International FC seasons